Sainte-Austreberthe is a commune in the Pas-de-Calais department in the Hauts-de-France region of France.

Geography
Sainte-Austreberthe is a suburb of Hesdin, located 15 miles (24 km) southeast of Montreuil-sur-Mer at the junction of the D340 and D113 roads.

Population

Places of interest
 The church of St. Austreberthe, dating from the seventeenth century
 A chapel

See also
Communes of the Pas-de-Calais department

References

Sainteaustreberthe
Artois